The People's National Party is a political party in Tonga. The party was formed in June 2018 and is led by former diplomat Siamelie Latu. Other key members include former finance minister ʻAisake Eke and Auckland-based lawyer Sione Fonua.

The party supports "traditional Tongan values" and the monarchy.

References

Political parties in Tonga
Political parties established in 2018
2018 establishments in Tonga
Conservative parties
Monarchist parties